The Supreme Court of Algeria is the highest court of appeal in Algeria. It can only review lower court decisions on questions of procedure. When overruled the case will be returned to the lower courts for retrial.

The court is located in Algiers, and was created by Law 218/63. Its judicial authority is defined by Law 22/89. Its president is Sulayman Budi, and the attorney general is Ben 'Ubayd al-Wardi.

References

1963 establishments in Algeria
Law of Algeria
Algeria, Supreme Court of